Latimer was an electoral ward and administrative division of the city of Leicester, England, consisting of the residential suburb of St Marks.

History
The St Marks estate was built in the wake of Leicester's slum clearance programmes in 1960.

Geography
Latimer is bounded was the wards of Belgrave to the north, Spinney Hills to the south, Abbey to the west and North Evington to the east.

Demographics
The Latimer ward had a population of 11,583, with an average age of 35, in line with the average for Leicester. It has the highest concentration of Indian residents in Leicester, at 74% of Latimer's population, compared to 25% across the city. Only 16% of Latimer residents are native British.

References

Areas of Leicester